Thomas Stearn (20 November 1796, at Cambridge – 21 March 1862, at Cambridge) was an English professional cricketer who played first-class cricket from 1825 to 1840.  He was mainly associated with Cambridge Town Club and made 22 known appearances in first-class matches.

References

External links

Bibliography
 Arthur Haygarth, Scores & Biographies, Volume 1-2 (1744–1840), Lillywhite, 1862

1796 births
1862 deaths
English cricketers
English cricketers of 1787 to 1825
English cricketers of 1826 to 1863
Cambridge Town Club cricketers